G. Srinivas (born 18 December 1971) is an Indian former cricketer. He played two List A matches for Hyderabad in 1997/98.

See also
 List of Hyderabad cricketers

References

External links
 

1971 births
Living people
Indian cricketers
Hyderabad cricketers
Place of birth missing (living people)